Katja Maria Riosianu Medbøe (3 December 1945 –  c. 13 November 1996) was a Norwegian actress.

She graduated from the Norwegian National Academy of Theatre in 1968, and acted both at Den Nationale Scene and at the National Theatre. Medbøe was best known for her role in the Hustruer-trilogy (Wives), along with Frøydis Armand and Anne Marie Ottersen. She also released records with poetry readings set to music.

In December 1996, Medbøe's sister, Wenche Medbøe, announced that Katja had been missing for three weeks, and made a public appeal for tips. As a result of a head injury she had experienced pain from the stage lighting. On 12 November she had left the hospital and not been seen since. On 3 May 1997, she was found dead in Nordmarkaa forest area north of Oslo. Medbøe had two children. The cause of death was, according to her daughter, Eline Medbøe, suicide.

Select filmography

References

External links

1945 births
1996 suicides
Norwegian film actresses
Norwegian stage actresses
Oslo National Academy of the Arts alumni
20th-century Norwegian actresses
Suicides in Norway
1996 deaths